The 1998 Big Ten Conference baseball tournament was held at Illinois Field on the campus of the University of Illinois at Urbana–Champaign in Champaign, Illinois, from May 15 through 19. The top four teams from the regular season participated in the double-elimination tournament, the eighteenth annual tournament sponsored by the Big Ten Conference to determine the league champion.  won their sixth tournament championship and earned the Big Ten Conference's automatic bid to the 1998 NCAA Division I baseball tournament.

Format and seeding 
The 1998 tournament was a 4-team double-elimination tournament, with seeds determined by conference regular season winning percentage only.

Tournament

All-Tournament Team 
The following players were named to the All-Tournament Team.

Most Outstanding Player 
Mark Groebner was named Most Outstanding Player. Groebner was an outfielder for Minnesota.

References 

Tournament
Big Ten baseball tournament
Big Ten Baseball Tournament
Big Ten baseball tournament